Khum Srang is a small town in Kong Pisei District in Kampong Speu Province, Cambodia. The National Road 124 passes through the town in a north–south direction while the National Road 125 passes from east to west and then leading north-west to connect the town to Kampong Speu.

External links
Map of Khum Srang

Towns in Cambodia
Populated places in Kampong Speu province